In mathematics and computability theory, an elementary cellular automaton is a one-dimensional cellular automaton where there are two possible states (labeled 0 and 1) and the rule to determine the state of a cell in the next generation depends only on the current state of the cell and its two immediate neighbors. There is an elementary cellular automaton (rule 110, defined below) which is capable of universal computation, and as such it is one of the simplest possible models of computation.

The numbering system
There are 8 = 23 possible configurations for a cell and its two immediate neighbors. The rule defining the cellular automaton must specify the resulting state for each of these possibilities so there are 256 = 223 possible elementary cellular automata. Stephen Wolfram proposed a scheme, known as the Wolfram code, to assign each rule a number from 0 to 255 which has become standard. Each possible current configuration is written in order, 111, 110, ..., 001, 000, and the resulting state for each of these configurations is written in the same order and interpreted as the binary representation of an integer. This number is taken to be the rule number of the automaton. For example, 110d=011011102. So rule 110 is defined by the transition rule:

Reflections and complements
Although there are 256 possible rules, many of these are trivially equivalent to each other up to a simple transformation of the underlying geometry. The first such transformation is reflection through a vertical axis and the result of applying this transformation to a given rule is called the mirrored rule. These rules will exhibit the same behavior up to reflection through a vertical axis, and so are equivalent in a computational sense.

For example, if the definition of rule 110 is reflected through a vertical line, the following rule (rule 124) is obtained:

Rules which are the same as their mirrored rule are called amphichiral. Of the 256 elementary cellular automata, 64 are amphichiral.

The second such transformation is to exchange the roles of 0 and 1 in the definition. The result of applying this transformation to a given rule is called the complementary rule.
For example, if this transformation is applied to rule 110, we get the following rule

and, after reordering, we discover that this is rule 137:

There are 16 rules which are the same as their complementary rules.

Finally, the previous two transformations can be applied successively to a rule to obtain the mirrored complementary rule. For example, the mirrored complementary rule of rule 110 is rule 193. There are 16 rules which are the same as their mirrored complementary rules.

Of the 256 elementary cellular automata, there are 88 which are inequivalent under these transformations.

Single 1 histories
One method used to study these automata is to follow its history with an initial state of all 0s except for a single cell with a 1. When the rule number is even (so that an input of 000 does not compute to a 1) it makes sense to interpret state at each time, t, as an integer expressed in binary, producing a sequence a(t) of integers. In many cases these sequences have simple, closed form expressions or have a generating function with a simple form. The following rules are notable:

Rule 28
The sequence generated is 1, 3, 5, 11, 21, 43, 85, 171, ... . This is the sequence of Jacobsthal numbers and has generating function

.

It has the closed form expression

Rule 156 generates the same sequence.

Rule 50
The sequence generated is 1, 5, 21, 85, 341, 1365, 5461, 21845, ... . This has generating function
.

It has the closed form expression
.

Note that rules 58, 114, 122, 178, 186, 242 and 250 generate the same sequence.

Rule 54
The sequence generated is 1, 7, 17, 119, 273, 1911, 4369, 30583, ... . This has generating function
.

It has the closed form expression
.

Rule 60
The sequence generated is 1, 3, 5, 15, 17, 51, 85, 255, .... This can be obtained by taking successive rows of Pascal's triangle modulo 2 and interpreting them as integers in binary, which can be graphically represented by a Sierpinski triangle.

Rule 90

The sequence generated is 1, 5, 17, 85, 257, 1285, 4369, 21845, ... . This can be obtained by taking successive rows of Pascal's triangle modulo 2 and interpreting them as integers in base 4. Note that rules 18, 26, 82, 146, 154, 210 and 218 generate the same sequence.

Rule 94
The sequence generated is 1, 7, 27, 119, 427, 1879, 6827, 30039, ... . This can be expressed as

.

This has generating function

.

Rule 102
The sequence generated is 1, 6, 20, 120, 272, 1632, 5440, 32640, ... . This is simply the sequence generated by rule 60 (which is its mirror rule) multiplied by successive powers of 2.

Rule 110

The sequence generated is 1, 6, 28, 104, 496, 1568, 7360, 27520, 130304, 396800, ... . Rule 110 has the perhaps surprising property that it is Turing complete, and thus capable of universal computation.

Rule 150
The sequence generated is 1, 7, 21, 107, 273, 1911, 5189, 28123, ... . This can be obtained by taking the coefficients of the successive powers of (1+x+x2) modulo 2 and interpreting them as integers in binary.

Rule 158
The sequence generated is 1, 7, 29, 115, 477, 1843, 7645, 29491, ... . This has generating function

.

Rule 188
The sequence generated is 1, 3, 5, 15, 29, 55, 93, 247, ... . This has generating function

.

Rule 190
The sequence generated is 1, 7, 29, 119, 477, 1911, 7645, 30583, ... . This has generating function

.

Rule 220
The sequence generated is 1, 3, 7, 15, 31, 63, 127, 255, ... . This is the sequence of Mersenne numbers and has generating function

.

It has the closed form expression
.
Note that rule 252 generates the same sequence.

Rule 222
The sequence generated is 1, 7, 31, 127, 511, 2047, 8191, 32767, ... . This is every other entry in the sequence of Mersenne numbers and has generating function

.

It has the closed form expression
.

Note that rule 254 generates the same sequence.

Images for rules 0-99
These images depict space-time diagrams, in which each row of pixels shows the cells of the automaton at a single point in time, with time increasing downwards. They start with an initial automaton state in which a single cell, the pixel in the center of the top row of pixels, is in state 1 and all other cells are 0.

Random initial state

A second way to investigate the behavior of these automata is to examine its history starting with a random state. This behavior can be better understood in terms of Wolfram classes. Wolfram gives the following examples as typical rules of each class.
 Class 1: Cellular automata which rapidly converge to a uniform state. Examples are rules 0, 32, 160 and 232.
 Class 2: Cellular automata which rapidly converge to a repetitive or stable state. Examples are rules 4, 108, 218 and 250.
 Class 3: Cellular automata which appear to remain in a random state. Examples are rules 22, 30, 126, 150, 182.
 Class 4: Cellular automata which form areas of repetitive or stable states, but also form structures that interact with each other in complicated ways. An example is rule 110. Rule 110 has been shown to be capable of universal computation.

Each computed result is placed under that result's source creating a two-dimensional representation of the system's evolution.  

In the following gallery, this evolution from random initial conditions is shown for each of the 88 inequivalent rules. Below each image is the rule number used to produce the image, and in brackets the rule numbers of equivalent rules produced by reflection or complementing are included, if they exist.
As mentioned above, the reflected rule would produce a reflected image, while the complementary rule would produce an image with black and white swapped.

Unusual cases
In some cases the behavior of a cellular automaton is not immediately obvious. For example, for Rule 62, interacting structures develop as in a Class 4. But in these interactions at least one of the structures is annihilated so the automaton eventually enters a repetitive state and the cellular automaton is Class 2.

Rule 73 is Class 2 because any time there are two consecutive 1s surrounded by 0s, this feature is preserved in succeeding generations. This effectively creates walls which block the flow of information between different parts of the array. There are a finite number of possible configurations in the section between two walls so the automaton must eventually start repeating inside each section, though the period may be very long if the section is wide enough. These walls will form with probability 1 for completely random initial conditions. However, if the condition is added that the lengths of runs of consecutive 0s or 1s must always be odd, then the automaton displays Class 3 behavior since the walls can never form.

Rule 54 is Class 4 and also appears to be capable of universal computation, but has not been studied as thoroughly as Rule 110. Many interacting structures have been cataloged which collectively are expected to be sufficient for universality.

References

External links

 "Elementary Cellular Automata" at the Wolfram Atlas of Simple Programs
 32 bytes long MS-DOS executable drawing by cellular automaton (Rule 110 by default)
 A showcase of all the rules picked at random
Minimal CA emulation with Wolfram rule parser online in vanilla Javascript 

Cellular automata